César García Menéndez (born 27 August 1999) is a Spanish professional footballer who plays mainly as a right winger for Sporting de Gijón B.

Club career
Born in Avilés, Asturias, García represented Sporting de Gijón and Real Avilés CF as a youth. On 28 August 2018, after finishing his formation, he was loaned to Tercera División side Marino de Luanco, for one year.

García made his senior debut on 2 September 2018, coming on as a half-time substitute in a 0–4 away loss against CD Mosconia. He scored his first goal six days later by netting his team's second in a 3–0 home win over Caudal Deportivo, and finished the campaign with five goals in 38 appearances overall as his side narrowly missed out promotion in the play-offs.

Upon returning to the Rojiblancos, García renewed his contract until 2022 on 5 November 2019. He made his first team debut on 17 December, replacing Carlos Carmona in a 1–2 away loss against Zamora CF, for the season's Copa del Rey.

García's professional debut occurred on 12 November 2021, as he replaced fellow youth graduate Berto González in a 0–1 home loss against Real Sociedad B in the Segunda División championship.

References

External links

1999 births
Living people
People from Avilés
Spanish footballers
Footballers from Asturias
Association football wingers
Segunda División players
Segunda División B players
Tercera División players
Tercera Federación players
Sporting de Gijón B players
Marino de Luanco footballers
Sporting de Gijón players